Events from the year 1811 in Spain.

Incumbents
Monarch: Joseph I

Events
January 15 - Battle of Pla (1811)
April 22-May 12 - First Siege of Badajoz (1811)
May 5-June 29 - Siege of Tarragona (1811)
May 18-June 10 - Second Siege of Badajoz (1811)

Births
 January 28 – Fèlix Maria Falguera, jurist (died 1897)
 November 4 – Infante Sebastian of Portugal and Spain

Deaths
January 23 - Pedro Caro, 3rd Marquis of la Romana
March 3 - Rafael Menacho
November 26 - Gregorio García de la Cuesta
José María de la Cueva, 14th Duke of Alburquerque

 
1810s in Spain
Years of the 19th century in Spain